No apto para menores is a 1979 Argentine film.

External links
 

1979 films
Argentine comedy-drama films
1970s Spanish-language films
Films directed by Carlos Rinaldi
1970s Argentine films